This article will display the squads for the 2012 UEFA European Under-19 Championship.
Only players born on or after 1 January 1993 are eligible to play.

Every team had to submit a list of 18 players. Two of them must be goalkeepers.

Age, caps and goals are as of the start of the tournament, 3 July 2012.

Players in bold have later been capped at full international level.

Group A

Head coach: Arno Pijpers

Arno Pijpers named his final 18-man squad on 30 June 2012.

Head coach: Kostas Tsanas

Kostas Tsanas named his final 18-man squad on 21 June 2012.

Head coach: Edgar Borges

Edgar Borges named his final 18-man squad on 11 June 2012. On 17 June, André Teixeira replaced Edgar Ié after Ié fractured his fifth metatarsal on his left foot.

Head coach: Julen Lopetegui

Julen Lopetegui named his final 18-man squad on 28 June 2012.

1. Salva Ruiz was called up during the tournament due to an injury to Javier Manquillo.
2. Nono was called up during the tournament due to an injury to Saúl.

Group B

Head coach: Dinko Jeličić

1. Marko Malenica was called up during the tournament due to a knee ligament injury to Oliver Zelenika sustained during a training session.

Head coach: Noel Blake

Noel Blake named his final 18-man squad on 20 June 2012. Tom Thorpe was named the captain for the tournament.

Head coach: Pierre Mankowski

Head coach: Zoran Marić.

Player representation

By club

By club nationality 
 
Nations in italics are not represented by their national teams in the finals.

References

External links
Official website

Squads
UEFA European Under-19 Championship squads